Sir Roger Leighton Hall  (born 17 January 1939) is one of New Zealand's most successful playwrights, arguably best known for comedies that carry a vein of social criticism and feelings of pathos.

Biography

Early years
Hall was born in Woodford, Essex, England, and educated at London's University College School from 1952 until 1955, when he embarked on a career in insurance. He emigrated to New Zealand in 1957 and continued to work in insurance, also performing in amateur theatre in the city of Wellington. He continued to act while attending Wellington Teachers’ College and Victoria University of Wellington; fellow actor John Clarke praised his impression of then Prime Minister Keith Holyoake as the template for all others. Hall began writing plays for children while teaching, which included a spell at Berhampore School, Wellington. He became a naturalised New Zealander in 1980.

Career

Hall began writing for television in the 1960s – over the next four decades his television output would grow to include one-off plays, documentaries, pioneering New Zealand television series Buck House and Pukemanu and time on political satire Spin Doctors. Alongside his writing, he appeared on-screen with actor Grant Tilly on 60s sketch show In View of the Circumstances.

Hall's best-known work in New Zealand is probably his breakthrough play Glide Time (1976), which depicts the frustrations and petty triumphs of a group of so-called 'public servants' working in a government office. It gave rise to a radio show, a one-off television adaptation, then popular 1980s television series Gliding On. A sequel play and television series, both called Market Forces also followed, set in the "restructured" public service environment of New Zealand's post-Rogernomics era.

The characters of The Share Club (1987, before the Stock Market crash) and After the Crash (1988) were seen on television series Neighbourhood Watch.

Hall's best-known works internationally are Middle-Age Spread (1978, revised 1980) and Conjugal Rites (1991). Middle Age Spread revolves around a headmaster who has an affair with a young teacher. The tragi-comedy had a 15-month run in the West End and won the Comedy of the Year Award (Society of London Theatre) and in 1979 became one of the first New Zealand plays to be transformed into a feature film. Grant Tilly starred, as he had when the play debuted in Wellington. Conjugal Rites was made into a situation comedy series in the UK starring Gwen Taylor and Michael Williams . The characters from Conjugal Rites reappear in Hall's final play to date, Winding Up, which premiered at the Auckland Theatre Company in 2020.

He was co-writer with Philip Norman and A K Grant of Footrot Flats the Musical, which has had more than 120 productions in New Zealand and Australia. Their follow-up collaboration, Love Off the Shelf, premiered at the Fortune Theatre, Dunedin, in 1986. It had two pre-West End try-out productions in the United Kingdom, the second in 1993 directed by Sir Alan Ayckbourn at his Scarborough Theatre, and the libretto was published by Samuel French Limited.

In recent years, his plays Who Wants to be 100? (Anyone Who's 99) (2008), Four Flat Whites in Italy (2009), and A Shortcut to Happiness (2011) had hugely successful runs throughout New Zealand.  His show about grandparenting, You Can Always Hand Them Back (2012), has songs by British performer/songwriter Peter Skellern, and has been performed throughout New Zealand and had a season in the UK.

Hall has had many plays, series, and talks on radio, including The Dream Factory for the BBC.

Hall has contributed to the arts in several other ways. Most notably he organised the first NZ Writers' Week, held in Dunedin in 1989, where twenty-nine NZ writers appeared, NZ plays were performed, and various exhibitions linked to local writing were held. Thousands of people attended, and another Writers’ Week was held two years later, and the event continues in Dunedin in a modified form every two years.

In 2005, he arranged for a scene set on Takapuna Beach on Christmas Day in the 1930s from Bruce Mason's one-man play The End of the Golden Weather  to be performed on Takapuna Beach on Christmas Day. Actor Stephen Lovatt does the one-man show that is presented every year. It has now become an established tradition, with up to 500 people attending the free event. OXFAM benefits from a collection and Lovatt donates his fee to the same charity.

In the 1980s, Hall set up a society to improve children's television (Monitor) and has also served on many arts boards and organizations including the NZ Literary Fund Advisory Committee, the Dunedin Public Art Gallery, chairman of Fortune Theatre Board, Frank Sargeson Trust, Janet Frame Eden Street Trust, and Governor of the Arts Foundation of New Zealand.

Hall's autobiography, Bums on seats, was published by Penguin Books in 1998. He has also written for children and family audiences (with a series of pantomimes, staged annually at Circa Theatre from 2005 to 2012 and 2014–2015). in the 21st century has also been a frequent book reviewer and travel journalist in publications such as the New Zealand Listener, New Zealand Herald and Dominion-Post.

He has a son and a daughter. His daughter, Pip Hall, is a playwright and television producer.

Honours and awards
Hall was a Burns Fellow in 1977 and in 1978. In the 1987 New Year Honours, he was made a Companion of the Queen's Service Order for community service.  Victoria University made him an Honorary Doctor of Literature in 1996. He was appointed a Companion of the New Zealand Order of Merit in the 2003 Queen's Birthday Honours, for services as a playwright. In 2006 he was the subject of documentary Who Laughs Last.

In 2014 he was presented a Scroll of Honour from the Variety Artists Club of New Zealand Inc for a lifetime of excellence in the performing arts.

In 2015 he was awarded the Prime Minister's Awards for Literary Achievement in Fiction.

In the 2019 Queen's Birthday Honours, Hall was promoted to Knight Companion of the New Zealand Order of Merit, for services to theatre.

See also
:Category:Plays by Roger Hall
Television in New Zealand

References

Further reading 
Hall, Roger (1977). Glide Time. Wellington: Victoria University Press.

Hall, Roger (1978). Middle Age Spread. Wellington: Victoria University Press.

Hall, Roger (1979). State of the Play. Wellington: Victoria University Press.

Hall, Roger (1980). Prisoners of Mother England. Wellington: Playmarket.

Hall, Roger (1982). Fifty Fifty. Wellington: VIctoria University Press.

Hall, Roger (1983). Hot Water. Wellington: Victoria University Press.

Hall, Roger (1983). The Quiz in On Stage Book 1: 4 Plays for Secondary Schools ed. Dowling, David. Auckland: Longman Paul.

Hall, Roger (1984). Footrot Flats. Wellington: Playmarket / Independent Newspapers Limited.

Hall, Roger (1988). The Share Club. Wellington: Victoria University Press.

Hall, Roger (1992). Conjugal Rites. New York: Samuel French Inc.

Hall, Roger (9 March 1978). "What is so wrong with children's television in New Zealand". Otago Daily Times, p. 4.

Hall, Roger (January 1981). "The painter of Mt Pisa". Air New Zealand Skyway, pp. 20–24.

Hall, Roger (17 October 1987). "Dramatic lapses". New Zealand Listener,  p. 61.

Hall, Roger (4 February 1990). "Favourites". Sunday, p. 41.

Hall, Roger (March 1996). "Family ties: Halls of fame". North and South, no. 120, p. 14.

Hall, Roger (March 1996). "Hall marks: Hello sailor". North and South, pp. 44–45.

Hall, Roger (7 September 1996). "Pedalling on". New Zealand Listener, p. 58.

Hall, Roger (19 October 1996). "A train in Spain: Our playwright abroad stays mainly on the plain". New Zealand Listener,  p. 58.

Hall, Roger (21 December 1996). "Home comforts: Discover New Zealand's bed and breakfasts". New Zealand Listener,  p. 56.

Hall, Roger (22 February 1997). "Bunker mentality". New Zealand Listener,  p. 56.

Hall, Roger (July 1999), "The magic of uncertainty". Pacific Wave, pp. 48–51.

Hall Roger (31 March 2001). "The people next door". New Zealand Listener, pp. 58–59.

Hall, Roger (14 September 2002). "The Balkan trilogy". New Zealand Listener, pp. 44–46.

Hall, Roger (8 May 2004). "Get thee to a St Vincent de Paul opshop". New Zealand Listener, p. 54.

Hall, Roger (30 May 2004).  "The best and worst of times". Sunday Star-Times, pp. 16–17.

Hall, Roger (17 July 2004). "Our flag". New Zealand Listener, p. 7.

Hall, Roger (14 August 2004). "The double exile of Peter Bland". New Zealand Listener, p. 46.

Hall, Roger (11 September 2004). "Gielgud the actor". New Zealand Listener, p. 7.

Hall, Roger (2 October 2004). "What I read". New Zealand Listener, p. 12.

Hall, Roger (20 November 2004). "Hail, the archivists". New Zealand Listener, p. 8.

Hall, Roger (8 July 2007). [Letter]. New Zealand Listener, p. 8.

Hall, Roger (23 September 2006). "Billy the kid". Dominion-Post, Indulgence p. 16.

Hall, Roger (20 January 2007). "The play's the thing". New Zealand Listener, pp. 40–41.

Hall, Roger (4 August 2007). "Fast trains coming". New Zealand Listener, p. 7.

Hall, Roger (8 December 2007). "Club sport". New Zealand Listener, p. 6.

Hall, Roger (22 December 2007). "The hotel inspector". Dominion-Post, Indulgence p. 22.

Hall, Roger (19 January 2008). "Coward's court". Dominion-Post, Indulgence p. 19.

Hall, Roger (19 September 2009). [Letter]. New Zealand Listener, p. 8.

Hall, Roger (1 January 2011). "Roger Hall playwright". New Zealand Listener, p. 14.

Hall, Roger (7 August 2011). "An antidote to hindsight". Sunday Star-Times, p. C13.

Hall, Roger (8  February 2014). "The 75 year-old playwright opens his family album". Your Weekend, p. 12.

Hall, Roger (12 March 2016). "'It was embarrassing'". New Zealand Listener, p. 34.

Hall, Roger (2 -8 August 2016). "Hopefully". New Zealand Listener, p. 22.

Hall, Roger (19 September 2018). "Burns fellow thanks". Otago Daily Times, p. 6.

Hall, Roger (5 January 2019). "FASD and male violence". New Zealand Listener, p. 4.

Hall, Roger (2 February 2019). "A loyal, funny friend, and a brilliant man". Dominion-Post, p. C6.

Adams, Geoff (11 November 1998). "What comes after this appetiser?" Otago Daily Times, p. 22.

Bamber, Shaun (11 September 2016). "'Last' call for Hall". Sunday Star-Times, p. E30.

Barnett, Nick (2 August 2001), "Ordinary is marvellous". Dominion-Post, p. 17.

Baskett, Pat (9-10 October 1999). "Write on". New Zealand Herald, p. J6.

Beresford, Rosemary (9 August 1986). "Gliding off to other things". New Zealand Listener, pp. 38–39.

Bertram, Gavin (1 May 2013). "Playwright mines universal experiences of grandparents". Dominion-Post, p. 13.

Campbell, Gordon (23 August 1980). "Roger Hall: nothing exceeds like success". New Zealand Listener, p. 14.

Cardy, Tom (13 November 2014). "Pulling them in with pantomime".  Dominion-Post, p. A13.

Christian, Dionne (30 April 2007). "'Me and my girl'", New Zealand Woman's Weekly, pp. 28–29.

Cohen, David (11 April 2003). "Is there a (suitable qualified) doctor in the house?". National Business Review, p. 4.

Colbert, Roy (25 March 1995). "For Hall the world's a stage". New Zealand Listener, pp. 10–11.

Cook, Marjorie (14 April 2011). "Rugby tour provided dramatic insight". Otago Daily Times, p. 16.

Cook, Marjorie (16 April 2011). "Dry wit and drops of sweat". Otago Daily Times, p. 21.

Croot, James (31 August 2018). "Stage is set for NZ theatre celebration". Dominion-Post, pp. 24–25.

Daly-Peoples, John (6 July 2001). "When a middle class hero is something to be". National Business Review, p. 31.

Daniell, Sarah (17 November 2007). "The interview: Roger Hall". New Zealand Listener. p. 12.

Dekker, Diana (19 May 2007). "Playing with dad". Dominon-Post, p. E8.

Dunbar, Anna (4 April 1998). "Hall of fame". Press, Weekend p. 1.

Dungey, Kim (26 September 1998). "Seriously funny business". Otago Daily Times, p. 70.

Easther, Elizabeth (26 March 2016). "Hallmarks of Success". New Zealand Listener, pp. 50–53.

Empson, Madelaine (4 - 18 September 2018). "New Zealand Theatre Month". Regional News no. 87, p. 12.

Empson, Madelaine (4 - 18 September 2019). "Elevate and celebrate". Regional News, p. 9.

Fleming, Donna (22 October 2001). "Gliding on". New Zealand Woman's Weekly, p. 31.

Forbes, Michael (24 October 2014). "Playwright glides on through award win". Dominion-Post, p. 2.

Fox, Rebecca (27 April 2017). "Retiring nature". Otago Daily Times, p. 23.

Gibb, John (13 November 1992). "British series on Hall comedy". Otago Daily Times, p. 1.

Gilbertson, Georgia-May (29 August 2020). "Theatre's great offer stuns community group". Dominion-Post, p. 12.

Gregg, Stacy (20 September 1998). "The Hall way". Sunday Star-Times, p. F1.

Hewitson, Michele (2 June 2007). "Roger Hall". New Zealand Herald, p. A28.

Hunt, Tom (25 June 2011). "Trustworthy - but not with the Tim Tams". Dominion-Post, p. A25.

Jackman, Amy (20 November 2014). "Hall helps theatre funding". Wellingtonian, p. 4.

Klein-Nixon, Kylie (5 March 2021). "How a loathing of DIY created one of our greatest playwrights". Dominion-Post, p. 10.

McDonald, Alister (September 1987). "Hall of mirrors". Centrestage Australia, 2 no. 1, pp. 14–15.

Lowe, Robert (19 November 1997). "Hall glides in from France". Otago Daily Times, p. 23.

McKee, Hannah (23 November 2015). "Prince of Thieves is in the hood." Dominion-Post, p. A13.

McKinlay, Tom (2 June 2003). "Honour 'really nice'". Otago Daily Times, p. 3.

McLeod, Rosemary (January 1988). "The year of Roger Hall". North and South, pp. 113–118.

McNaughton, Iona (27 September 1987). "Hall sees irony in criticism of comedy". Dominion Sunday Times, p. 19.

Manins, Rosie (3 September 2012). "Warmer nights, cultural events keep playwright in city". Otago Daily Times, p. 2.

Matthews,  Lee (4 April 2012), "Observer of our times". Manawatu Standard, p. 2.

Moore, Christopher (21 August 2009). "The life and times of Roger Hall". Press, p. 12.

O'Hare, Noel (25 June 1990). "Hall's humour". New Zealand Listener and TV Times, pp. 40–41.

Peacock, Colin (Summer 1992). "Gliding on". New Zealand Jester, no. 1, pp. 24–25.

Peters, Geraldine (21 May 1990). "Playing for laughs". Salient, vol. 53 no. 10, pp. 10–11.

Ralston, Bill (29 August 2009). "The artful Roger". New Zealand Listener, pp. 29–31.

Rae, Sally (15 March 2008). "Restored Frame home pleases Hall". Otago Daily Times, p. 19.

Reinsborg, Niels (18-26 April 2012). "No glide time for Hall". Capital Times, p. 7.

Revington, Mark (16 August 2003). "It's now or never". New Zealand Listener, p. 66.

Smith, Charmian (27 February 1993). "Roger Hall: economic value of the arts". Otago Daily Times, p. 8.

Smith, Charmian (10 November 2011). "People like to laugh". Otago Daily Times, p. 37.

Spencer, Ruth (3 June 2012). "Every missed laugh is painful". Sunday Star-Times, Culture, pp. 1, 4–5.

Staff Reporter (23 September 1977). "Sowing some seeds". Otago Daily Times, p. 13.

Staff Reporter (January 1990). "Roger Hall". North and South, pp. 89–90.

Staff Reporter (December 1990). " Roger Hall playwright was: primary school teacher". North and South, p. 110.

Staff Reporter (16 February 1990). "Roger Hall". Evening Standard, p. 2.

Staff Reporter (6 January 1996). "Doctorate for playwright". Otago Daily Times, p. 30.

Staff Reporter (1 November 1996). "Playwright wins Mansfield award". Evening Post, p. 2.

Staff Reporter (January 1997). North and South, no. 130, p. 19.

Staff Reporter (4 September 1999). "Turning points". New Zealand Listener, pp. 62–63.

Staff Reporter (January 2002). "Roger Hall". North and South, no. 190, p. 60.

Staff Reporter (2 June 2003). "Celebration scene for top playwright". Dominion-Post, p. A4.

Staff Reporter (19-25 August 2009). "THE Roger Hall". Capital Times, p. 5.

Staff Reporter (1 September 2018). "Celebrating the Burns fellowship". Otago Daily Times, weekly mix p. 12.

Staff Reporter (8 September 2018). "Theatre Month dream now a reality". Dominion-Post p. A15.

Staff Reporter (2 June 2019). "Roger Hall's knighthood writes a new chapter for NZ theatre". New Zealand Herald, p. 3.

Staff Reporter (3 June 2019). "Corlett honoured; playwright Hall knighted". Otago Daily Times, pp. 1–3.

Vincent, Rosemary (11 August 1985). "Roger Hall - beneath the surface". New Zealand Times, p. 11.

Watson White, Helen (5 June 1994). "Hall happy to write old-fashioned revue". Sunday Star Times, p. D5.

Welsh, Denis (8 November 1997). "Hall of fame". Listener, pp. 40–41.

Welch, Denis (28 March 1998). "Gliding back". Listener, pp. 68–69.

Welch, Denis (14-20 July 2001). "King of comedy". New Zealand Listener, pp. 18–22.

Wichtel, Diana (10 November 2001). "What the doctor ordered". New Zealand Listener, p. 77.

Zander, Bianca (13 October 2001). "PR & other jokes". New Zealand Listener, p. 24.

External links
"Roger Hall" NZ On Screen. March 2009. Retrieved 13 April 2012.
Roger Hall bibliography at the New Zealand Literature File
 http://www.creativenz.govt.nz/results-of-our-work/award-winners/prime-minister-s-awards-for-literary-achievement

1939 births
Living people
English emigrants to New Zealand
Knights Companion of the New Zealand Order of Merit
Companions of the Queen's Service Order
New Zealand male dramatists and playwrights
Laurence Olivier Award winners
New Zealand production designers
People educated at University College School
Naturalised citizens of New Zealand
20th-century New Zealand dramatists and playwrights
20th-century New Zealand male writers
21st-century New Zealand dramatists and playwrights
21st-century New Zealand male writers